The Higueruelas (Spanish) or Higuerueles Formation (Catalan) is a Tithonian geologic formation in the Teruel and Valencia provinces of Spain. Fossil sauropod tracks have been reported from the formation.

Fossil content 
The following fossils were reported from the formation:
 Machimosaurus sp.
 ?Allosauroidea indet.
 Crocodyliformes indet.
Ichnofossils
 Theropoda indet.

Correlation

See also 
 List of dinosaur-bearing rock formations
 List of stratigraphic units with sauropodomorph tracks
 Sauropod tracks

References

Bibliography 

 
  
 
 

Geologic formations of Spain
Jurassic System of Europe
Jurassic Spain
Tithonian Stage
Limestone formations
Shallow marine deposits
Ichnofossiliferous formations
Paleontology in Spain
Formations